The Municipality of Kranjska Gora is a municipality on the Sava Dolinka River in the Upper Carniola region of northwest Slovenia, close to the Austrian and Italian borders. The seat of the municipality is the town of Kranjska Gora.

Geography
The municipality is located in the Upper Sava Valley, a typical Alpine valley. Located at the far northwest of Slovenia where the borders of Slovenia, Austria, and Italy meet, the valley is embraced on the north and south by the peaks of the Karawanks and the Julian Alps. In the east its border runs just below the town of Jesenice, where the valley opens up towards the Radovljica Valley, extending in the west along the watershed between the Sava and Slizza rivers, just west of Rateče. In the north the Wurzenpass at Podkoren leads to Arnoldstein in Carinthia, in the south the Vršič Pass connects it with Trenta in the Slovenian Littoral region.

The Upper Sava Valley has an Alpine climate with its long, snow-abundant winters and shorter summers with moderate temperatures, easterly winds and sufficient rain to maintain the valley's greenery. The winter usually stays in the valley for between four and five months, and a blanket of snow usually covers the valley for just around four months. The lowest daytime temperature in January sometimes reaches , while on average it usually warms up during the day to just over freezing point. In winter, there are large differences between the sunny and shady slopes embracing the valley. The sunny slopes are accommodating to hikes and strolls, while the shady slopes retain a snow blanket.

Settlements

In addition to the municipal seat of Kranjska Gora, the municipality also includes the following settlements:

 Belca
 Dovje
 Gozd Martuljek
 Log
 Mojstrana
 Podkoren
 Rateče
 Srednji Vrh
 Zgornja Radovna

Gallery

See also
Kranjska Gora Ski Resort

References

External links 

Municipality of Kranjska Gora on Geopedia

 
Kranjska Gora
1994 establishments in Slovenia
States and territories established in 1994